Statistics of Austrian first league in the 1926–27 season.

Overview
It was contested by 13 teams, and SK Admira Wien won the championship.

League standings

Results

References
Austria - List of final tables (RSSSF)

Austrian Football Bundesliga seasons
Austria
1926–27 in Austrian football